This article lists the winners and nominees for the NAACP Image Award for Outstanding Writing in a Motion Picture. The award was first presented in 2008.

Winners and nominees
For each year in the tables below, the winner is listed first and highlighted in bold.

2000s

2010s

2020s

Multiple wins and nominations

Wins
 3 wins
 Ryan Coogler

 2 wins
 Jordan Peele

Nominations

 3 nominations
 Ryan Coogler
 Jordan Peele

 2 nominations
 Rick Famuyiwa
 Tyler Perry
 Dee Rees
 Elizabeth Hunter
 John Ridley
 Barry Jenkins

External links
 NAACP Image Awards official site

NAACP Image Awards